Oriol Bohigas] (1925–2021) was a Spanish architect and urban planner.

Oriol Bohigas may also refer to:

Oriol Bohigas Martí (1937–2013), Spanish and French theoretical physicist